Tomáš Mikúš (born 1 July 1993) is a Slovak professional ice hockey left winger currently playing for HC Nové Zámky of the Slovak Extraliga.

Career statistics

Regular season and playoffs

International

External links

1993 births
Living people
HC Slovan Bratislava players
HK 36 Skalica players
Slovak ice hockey right wingers
Hokki players
HC Olomouc players
HK Nitra players
HC Karlovy Vary players
PSG Berani Zlín players
HC Nové Zámky players
Sportspeople from Skalica
Slovak expatriate ice hockey players in Finland
Slovak expatriate ice hockey players in the Czech Republic